Fimber is a village and civil parish in the East Riding of Yorkshire, England. It lies on the B1248 road.
The civil parish is formed by the village of Fimber and the hamlet of Towthorpe.
According to the 2001 UK Census, Fimber parish had a population of 91.

The church of St Mary, Fimber was built in 1869–71 in a thirteenth-century style to replace a chapel of ease. The church was designated a Grade II listed building in September 1966 and is now recorded in the National Heritage List for England, maintained by Historic England. It is on the Sykes Churches Trail devised by the East Yorkshire Churches Group.

Fimber was served by Sledmere and Fimber railway station on the Malton and Driffield Railway between 1853 and 1950.

In 1823 the village was in the parish of Wetwang, the Wapentake of Buckrose, and the Liberty of St Peter. At the time there was a chapel of ease at which the rector of Wetwang was its incumbent curate. Population was 904, which included seven farmers, a grocer, a shoemaker, and a tailor.

References

Villages in the East Riding of Yorkshire
Civil parishes in the East Riding of Yorkshire